Braithwell is a civil parish in the metropolitan borough of Doncaster, South Yorkshire, England.  The ward contains 15 listed buildings that are recorded in the National Heritage List for England.  Of these, one is listed at Grade II*, the middle of the three grades, and the others are at Grade II, the lowest grade.  The parish contains the villages of Braithwell and Micklebring and the surrounding area.  The listed buildings include houses and associated structures, the ruins of a medieval house, a church, memorials in the churchyard, a village cross, a milestone, and a war memorial.


Key

Buildings

References

Citations

Sources

 

Lists of listed buildings in South Yorkshire
Buildings and structures in the Metropolitan Borough of Doncaster